"Diamond Rings and Old Barstools" is a song recorded by American country music artist Tim McGraw featuring Catherine Dunn. It was released in January 2015 as the fourth and final single from his second studio album for Big Machine Records, Sundown Heaven Town. The song was written by Jonathan Singleton, Barry Dean and Luke Laird.

Content
The song is a mid-tempo ballad featuring backing vocals from McGraw's cousin, Catherine Dunn. Its lyrics mainly compare certain objects such as "midnight and cigarette smoke" and "watered-down whiskey and Coke" to illustrate a story of two people who are incompatible with each other.

Critical reception
Jon Freeman of Country Weekly gave the song an A−, saying that "It's a gorgeous production: sparse without being skeletal, warm without being overbearing and perfectly tailored to Tim's oak-aged vocals." He said of the lyrics that "Not all of the pairings in the lyric make perfect sense, but that doesn't take anything away from the overall effect and message."

The song was nominated at the 58th Grammy Awards for Best Country Song.

Music video
The music video was directed by Brian Olinger and premiered in March 2015.

Chart performance
The song has sold 298,000 copies in the US as of July 2015.

Year-end charts

Certifications

References

2014 songs
2015 singles
Tim McGraw songs
Big Machine Records singles
Male–female vocal duets
Songs written by Barry Dean (songwriter)
Songs written by Luke Laird
Songs written by Jonathan Singleton
Song recordings produced by Byron Gallimore
Song recordings produced by Tim McGraw